"Master Blaster (Jammin')" is a 1980 song by American singer-songwriter Stevie Wonder, released as the lead single from his nineteenth studio album, Hotter than July (1980). It was a major hit, spending seven weeks at number one on the US Billboard R&B singles chart, reaching number five on Billboard's pop singles chart in the fall of 1980 and peaking at number two on the UK Singles Chart, and number one in New Zealand.

History
The song, built on a heavy reggae feel, is an ode to reggae legend Bob Marley; Wonder had been performing live with Marley (billing him as an opening act) on his US tour in the fall of that year.  Lyrics mention "children of Jah", "Marley's Hot on the box" and the end of the civil war in Zimbabwe. The song has a similar feel to Marley's own song "Jamming," from his 1977 album Exodus.

Record World said that it combines "topical urban street themes with reggae-pop rhythms."

Personnel
 Stevie Wonder – vocals, Fender Rhodes, clavinet
 Nathan Watts – bass
 Benjamin Bridges – guitar
 Dennis Davis – drums
 Earl DeRouen – percussion
 Isaiah Sanders –  organ
 Hank Redd – saxophone
 Larry Gittens – trumpet
 Rick Zunigar – guitar
 Background vocals – Angela Winbush, Alexandra Brown Evans, Shirley Brewer, Marva Holcolm

Charts

Weekly charts

Year-end charts

Certifications

DJ Luck & MC Neat version

"Master Blaster (Jammin')" was covered by UK garage duo DJ Luck & MC Neat featuring singer JJ, initially titled as "On da Street" which was released on the Red Rose EP in 1999. The following year, on 15 May 2000, the song was released as a single and retitled as "Masterblaster 2000". This version was a top-five hit, peaking at number five on the UK Singles Chart. It samples the All-Star Remix of "No Diggity" by Blackstreet, which itself samples "As Long as I've Got You" by the Charmels.

In November 2016, UK duo Gorgon City compiled a list of their top UK garage songs for Billboard, with "Masterblaster 2000" at number 29. In 2018, the House & Garage Orchestra together with MC Neat and Oggie recorded an orchestral version for the UK garage covers album Garage Classics.

Charts

Certifications

References

1980 songs
1980 singles
2000 singles
American reggae songs
Cashbox number-one singles
Motown singles
Number-one singles in Austria
Number-one singles in New Zealand
Number-one singles in Sweden
Number-one singles in Switzerland
Number-one singles in Italy
Stevie Wonder songs
Songs about Bob Marley
Songs written by Stevie Wonder
Tamla Records singles
Song recordings produced by Stevie Wonder